Bharoto Bhagyo Bidhata is a five-stanza Brahmo hymn in Bengali. It was composed and scored in Bengali by Nobel laureate Rabindranath Tagore in 1911. The first stanza of the song has been adopted as the National Anthem of India.

History of Jana Gana Mana
The poem was first sung on the second day of the annual session of the Indian National Congress in Calcutta on 27 December 1911. The Ssong was performed by Sarala Devi Chowdhurani, Tagore's niece, along with a group of school students, in front of prominent Congress Members like Bishan Narayan Dhar, Indian National Congress President and Ambika Charan Majumdar.

In 1912, the song was published under the title Bharat Bhagya Bidhata in the Tatwabodhini Patrika, which was the official publication of the Brahmo Samaj and of which Tagore was the Editor.

Outside of Calcutta, the song was first sung by the bard himself at a session in Besant Theosophical College in Madanapalle, Andhra Pradesh on 28 February 1919. The song enthralled the college authorities and they adopted the English version of the song as their prayer song which is still sang today. Tagore made the first English translation of the song at Madanapalle.

On the occasion of India attaining freedom, the Indian Constituent Assembly assembled for the first time as a sovereign body on 14 August 1947, midnight and the session closed with a unanimous performance of Jana Gana Mana.

The members of the Indian Delegation to the General Assembly of the United Nations held at New York in 1947 gave a recording of Jana Gana Mana as the country's national anthem. The song was played by the house orchestra in front of a gathering consisting of representatives from all over the world.

Jana Gana Mana was officially proclaimed as India's National Anthem by the Constituent Assembly of India on 24 January 1950.

Lyrics of all 5 stanzas
The English translation below has been adapted from an unverifiable source. Some changes have been made to both the translation and romanization.

See also
 Jana Gana Mana (The National Anthem of India)
 Rabindranath Tagore
 Vande Mataram-The National Song of India
 Bankim Chandra Chattopadhyay
 Jana Gana Mana Video
 An earlier poem by Tagore (Amar Shonar Bangla) was later selected as the national anthem of Bangladesh.
 Chitto Jetha Bhayshunyo ("Where the Mind is Without Fear...Into that heaven of freedom, Let my country awake!") -a patriotic poem from Gitanjali by Rabindranath Tagore
 Ekla Chalo Re- A poem by Rabindranath Tagore and publicised by Subhas Chandra Bose
 Indian National Pledge by Pydimarri Venkata Subba Rao

References

Notes

External links
The Morning Song of India

Rabindranath Tagore
Bengali-language literature
Indian songs
Indian patriotic songs
Songs written by Rabindranath Tagore
Bengali-language songs
1911 in India
20th century in Kolkata
Rabindra Sangeet
Bengali music
Poems by Rabindranath Tagore